Sweden is an extinct town in Pickens County, in the U.S. state of Georgia. The GNIS classifies it as a populated place.

History
A post office called Sweden was established in 1894, and remained in operation until 1923. The community's name is a transfer from Sweden.

References

Geography of Pickens County, Georgia
Ghost towns in Georgia (U.S. state)